Frank Jewett may refer to:
 Frank Jewett (sailor), American Olympic sailor
 Frank B. Jewett, American engineer and physicist